UFO is a 1970 British science fiction television series about the covert efforts of a government defence organisation to prevent an alien invasion of Earth. It was created by Gerry Anderson and Sylvia Anderson with Reg Hill, and produced by the Andersons and Lew Grade's Century 21 for Grade's ITC Entertainment company.

A single series of 26 episodes (including the pilot) was filmed over the course of more than a year; a five-month production break was caused by the closure of MGM-British Studios in Borehamwood, where the show was initially made. Production then moved to Pinewood Studios in Buckinghamshire. UFO was first broadcast in the UK and Canada in 1970, and in the US syndication over the next two years. It also has been rerun on UKTV channel Drama.

The Andersons' live-action science fiction movie Doppelgänger (also known as Journey to the Far Side of the Sun) is considered an immediate precursor to UFO, which was their first entirely live-action TV series. (Their previous shows had used marionettes.) The series featured actors, costumes, props, locations and music that had appeared in the film, and 11 cast members of the film appeared in at least one episode of UFO.

Following syndication in the US and initial favourable ratings, a possible second series was planned; initially entitled UFO 1999, this eventually became Space: 1999, but with a totally different cast to UFO.

Storyline
The series' premise is that in 1980 (a date indicated repeatedly in the opening credits), Earth is being visited by aliens from a dying planet, who are abducting humans and harvesting their organs for their own bodies. The alien incursions may also be a prelude to a possible full-scale invasion. The series' main cast of characters are the staff of a secret, high-technology international military agency called SHADO (an acronym for Supreme Headquarters Alien Defence Organisation) established by the governments of the United Kingdom, the United States, the Soviet Union, France and Germany (believed to be West Germany as the city of Bonn is mentioned along with Washington, Paris and Moscow) to defend Earth and humanity against the mysterious aliens and learn more about them, while at the same time keeping the threat of an alien invasion hidden from the public.

Cast
UFO had a large ensemble cast; many of its members would come and go during the course of the series, with some actors—such as George Sewell and Gabrielle Drake—leaving midway through the series, during the production break necessitated by the change of studio facilities. It is established early on that SHADO personnel rotate between positions, so the occasional disappearance of characters—some of whom would later return in other positions—fits the concept of the series. Also, owing to the scheduling of the series not reflecting the production order, some episodes featuring departed cast members were not broadcast until late in the series, which can give the impression that no major cast changes occurred. Only Ed Bishop appeared in every episode.

Main characters
 Colonel Edward "Ed" Straker, Commander-in-chief of SHADO (Ed Bishop) is a former American Air Force colonel, pilot and astronaut originally from Boston, Massachusetts, who organised SHADO following a series of UFO attacks in 1970. Straker masquerades as the head of Harlington-Straker Film Studios, SHADO Headquarters being located directly below the studio.
 Colonel Paul Foster (Michael Billington) is introduced in the 2nd episode which is titled "Exposed". A former test pilot, his plane was critically damaged when SHADO's Sky One intercepted and destroyed a UFO in close proximity to Foster's jet. His persistent investigation of the incident threatened to expose SHADO's existence, so Straker offered him a position with SHADO.
 Lieutenant Gay Ellis (Gabrielle Drake), seen as Moonbase commander during the first half of the series. Lt. Ellis is occasionally portrayed as lacking self-confidence, and at other times as a take-charge officer. She is briefly reassigned to SHADO HQ when it is suggested that she may be romantically involved with interceptor pilot Mark Bradley ("Computer Affair").
 Colonel Alec Freeman, Second-in-command of SHADO (George Sewell) a former pilot and intelligence officer, is SHADO's first officer (and very first operative recruited into SHADO by Straker) for 17 episodes in the series (Sewell left following the change of studios, being later unavailable when series production resumed at Pinewood Studios). Freeman is Straker's closest friend and right-hand man and, occasionally, his muscle.
 General James Henderson, President of IAC (Grant Taylor), Straker's superior officer, serves as the president of the International Astrophysical Commission, which is a front for SHADO and is responsible for obtaining funds and equipment from various governments to keep SHADO operational. Straker and Henderson clash frequently over the needs of SHADO and economic realities.
 Colonel Virginia Lake (Wanda Ventham) first appears in the opening episode of the series ("Identified"), as the chief designer for Westbrook Electronics, the contractor for the SHADO's Utronics faster-than-light tracking system. During the last eight episodes, Lake returned to take over the post of SHADO first officer, replacing Alec Freeman.
 Captain Peter Carlin (Peter Gordeno), during the first third of the series, Carlin is the commander of the submarine Skydiver and pilot of its interceptor aircraft, Sky One. In 1970, Carlin and his sister found a UFO and were attacked; he was shot and wounded and his sister vanished. He joined SHADO in the hope of finding out what happened to his sister, and eventually learned that her organs had been harvested in the pilot episode "Identified." Gordeno left the show after six episodes because he wanted to avoid typecasting.
 Lieutenant Nina Barry (Dolores Mantez) is one of Straker's first recruits into SHADO. Barry works as a space tracker at Moonbase and later replaces Lieutenant Ellis as its commanding officer. She also serves aboard Skydiver at one point ("Sub-Smash").
 Captain Lew Waterman (Gary Myers) is initially an interceptor pilot on the Moon; he is later promoted to captain, and replaces Peter Carlin as commanding officer of Skydiver and pilot of Sky One.
 Lieutenant Keith Ford (Keith Alexander) is a former television interviewer who became a founding member of SHADO and its main communications officer. Actor Keith Alexander left the series after the production break, so the character disappears at the two-thirds mark of the series.
 Lieutenant Ayshea Johnson (Ayshea Brough) is a SHADO headquarters officer in 14 episodes, and later becomes SHADO's communications officer following the departure of Lt. Ford.
 Doctor Douglas Jackson (Vladek Sheybal) is the SHADO psychiatrist and science officer. He serves a number of capacities within SHADO, including acting as prosecution officer during the court-martial of Paul Foster. It is implied that "Douglas Jackson" is not the character's birth name, as he speaks with a strong Eastern European accent.
 Lieutenant Joan Harrington (Antonia Ellis) another Moonbase operative, was one of the organisation's earliest recruits, as seen in "Confetti Check A-O.K.".
 Miss Ealand (Norma Ronald) is a SHADO operative who masquerades as Straker's movie studio secretary. She is the first line of defence against anyone entering SHADO HQ via Straker's office/elevator. The character is not seen in most of the post-studio change episodes, being replaced in two episodes by a Miss Holland, played by Lois Maxwell.
 Lieutenant Mark Bradley (Harry Baird) is a Caribbean-born interceptor pilot based on the Moon. He becomes romantically involved with Lieutenant Ellis for a time, leading to a temporary assignment at SHADO HQ on Earth, and later briefly assumes the position of Moonbase commander. Baird left the series after filming four episodes, but appeared in stock footage in two later episodes.

Minor characters
One of the female Moonbase operatives, Joanna, was played by Shakira Baksh, who later married actor Michael Caine. Producer Gerry Anderson later said that he had lost his temper with her so badly on the set of UFO that he always feared the idea of running into Michael Caine at some actors' function, and being punched on the nose by him.

Steve Minto, one of the Interceptor pilots, was played by the actor Steven Berkoff.

Lieutenant Sylvia Howell, a Skydiver technician, was played by the actress Georgina Moon.

Broadcast
Owing to the fragmented nature of the ITV network in the United Kingdom at the time, the 26 episodes of UFO were broadcast out of production order, and every broadcaster showed the episodes in a different sequence. The list below, drawn from Chris Bentley's The Complete Book of Gerry Anderson's UFO, details the running order shown on ATV (in the Midlands). 
The North American DVD release of the series usually follows the production order, with a few diversions; a website ufoseries.com for the show offers seven possibilities of viewing sequence. According to The Complete Gerry Anderson, the episode "Exposed" was intended to be aired second, but it was produced fifth and appears as the fifth episode in the American DVD release. It was only when the entire series was repeated by BBC Two in 1996–1997 that the series was shown in chronological production order in the UK for the first time.

Episodes

Episode timeline
On the website shadolibrary.org, Deborah Rorabaugh has created a timeline of events in chronological order, using a few known dates and facts. For example, "Exposed" should come before all other episodes featuring Paul Foster, and there are a few definitive dates given (two newspaper dates, a death and script date). UFO Episode Timing.

Episode viewing lists 
  Prod: The studio production order.
  ATV: "Official" ITC sequence. This is the sequence in which the episodes were originally scheduled to be broadcast in the UK by ATV Midlands.
  UFO Series: Recommended order by Marc Martin of http://www.ufoseries.com.
  Fanderson: Recommended by Fanderson and used on British DVDs.
  ITC: Order used for VHS release in the UK.

Compilation films
A number of the episodes were cut and compiled to create compilation films.

United Kingdom
Invasion: UFO was a 1980 compilation of scenes from "Identified", "Computer Affair", "Reflections in the Water", "Confetti Check A-Ok", "The Man Who Came Back" and "E.S.P." featuring new title music.

Italy
Italian producers KENT and INDIEF made compilation films which met mixed reviews. The films used music tracks from the James Bond films From Russia with Love and Thunderball, for UFOs composer, Barry Gray, had his name confused with Bond composer John Barry.

 UFO – Allarme rosso... attacco alla Terra! (KENT, 1973) from episodes "The Cat with Ten Lives", "The Psychobombs" and "Timelash"
 UFO – Distruggete Base Luna (KENT, 1973)  from episodes "The Cat with Ten Lives", "Confetti Check A-Ok", "Flight Path", "The Psychobombs", "A Question of Priorities" and "Kill Straker!"
 UFO – Prendeteli vivi (INDIEF, 1974) from episodes "Computer Affair", "Ordeal", "The Sound of Silence", "Destruction" and "Reflections in the Water"
 UFO – Contatto Radar... stanno atterrando...! (INDIEF, 1974) from episodes "Exposed", "Survival", "Court Martial" and "Sub-Smash"
 UFO – Annientate SHADO... Uccidete Straker... Stop! (KENT, 1974) from episodes "Identified", "Computer Affair" and "Reflections in the Water"

Japan
A subtitled Invasion: UFO was released in Japan as the first of eight VHS and Betamax tape UFO volumes by Emotion Video in 1984, and on Laserdisc format.

Production

Concept

Following poor ratings for Joe 90 (1968–1969) and the cancellation of children's espionage television series The Secret Service (1969) after only one series, Lew Grade approached Gerry Anderson to look into creating his first live-action TV series. Anderson worked with his wife, Sylvia, and producer Reg Hill to create a science fiction adventure series based around UFOs. Anderson said the core idea for the series was that UFO sightings were a common issue during the late 1960s, and that the idea of aliens harvesting human organs came from the work of Christiaan Barnard and his pioneering transplant operations. The creative team initially envisioned an organisation called UFoeDO (Unidentified Foe Defence Organisation), which was to become the secret SHADO (Supreme Headquarters Alien Defence Organisation).

Many of the props and actors that had appeared in the Anderson-produced 1969 movie Doppelgänger were utilised in the series. The creators looked ten years ahead and placed the series in a 1980s future. Sylvia Anderson also designed the costumes for the show, including the Moonbase uniforms and purple wigs that female staff wore; the wigs were to become a major reference point for the series.

UFO featured key motifs and plot elements that shared a conceptual continuity with nearly all of Anderson's previous television work. Every series from Supercar onward focused on the heroic exploits of a secret but benevolent group or agency (the Supercar team, World Space Patrol, WASP, International Rescue, Spectrum, WIN, BISHOP, SHADO), operating from a remote or hidden base, and equipped with futuristic technology and/or advanced transport vehicles, whose mission is to protect the people of Earth from danger and disaster, and counter the nefarious schemes of a sinister, devious and elusive enemy (Masterspy, the Subterrains, the Aquaphibians, The Hood, The Mysterons, the aliens).

In addition to the shift from using marionettes to real actors, another key point of difference is that while Anderson's previous series were explicitly made for pre-teen audiences, UFO was a deliberate attempt to court young adult and adult viewers. Some UFO episodes included serious adult themes such as divorce, drug use, the challenge of maintaining work/family balance, mind control, alien abduction, illegal organ harvesting, and murder.

Filming
Principal photography commenced in April 1969 with production based at MGM-British Studios in Borehamwood. Seventeen episodes were filmed at these studios before they closed at the end of 1969. Production resumed at Pinewood Studios when studio space became available in June 1970, making UFO a 17-month-long production by the time the final nine episodes were completed. After the break, George Sewell (who played Alec Freeman) and Gabrielle Drake (Lt. Gay Ellis) were no longer available, and left the series.

Due to the series being shown out of production order, their omission was not overly noticeable. Previously, Harry Baird, who played interceptor pilot Mark Bradley, had left the series after just four episodes, citing contractual problems (although he reappeared in a few later episodes from stock footage). Also, Skydiver Captain Peter Carlin, played by Peter Gordeno, left after eight episodes out of a fear of being typecast.

The different writers and directors, as well as a production break when MGM-British Studios was closed, resulted in episodes of varying quality.

Cultural impact on episodes
Some episodes feature downbeat or tragic elements. In "Flight Path", a SHADO operative who has been blackmailed into giving crucial data to the aliens redeems himself by thwarting a sneak attack on Moonbase, but is killed in the attempt, and dies not knowing that his wife has been murdered by an alien agent. In "Survival", after another sneak attack on Moonbase, an injured Col. Foster encounters an alien on the lunar surface but, although the alien unexpectedly befriends and helps him, a misunderstanding leads to the alien being killed by SHADO operatives. "Confetti Check A-O.K." is almost entirely devoted to the breakdown of Straker's marriage under the strain of maintaining secrecy, owing to the classified nature of his duties. "A Question of Priorities" hinges on Straker having to choose between diverting a SHADO aircraft to deliver life-saving medical supplies to his critically injured son, or allow the aircraft to continue its mission to intercept an alien who appears to want to surrender to SHADO.

Another episode, "The Square Triangle", centres on a woman and her lover who plan to murder her husband. When they accidentally kill an alien from a downed UFO instead, SHADO intervenes and doses the guilty pair with amnesia drugs. Straker realises, however, that the drugs will not affect their basic motivation and, worse, he cannot reveal the truth to local legal authorities. The end credits of this episode run over a scene set in the near future, showing the woman visiting her husband's grave and then walking away to meet her lover.

Some critics complained that the emphasis on down-to-earth relationships weakened the show's science fiction premise and were also a means of saving money on special effects. Others countered that the characters were more well-rounded than in other science fiction shows, and that science fiction concepts and special effects in themselves did not preclude realistic action and interaction and believable, emotionally engaging plots.

UFO confused broadcasters in Britain and the United States, who could not decide if it was a show for adults or for children. In the UK, the first episodes were originally shown in the 5:15pm 'tea-time' slot on Saturdays, and then on Saturday mornings during an early repeat, by both Southern Television — which began broadcasting UFO almost two months before the London area — and London Weekend Television. The fact that the Andersons were primarily associated with children's programming did not help matters. This confusion and erratic broadcast schedules are considered contributing factors in its cancellation, although UFO is credited with opening the door to moderately successful runs of later live-action, adult-oriented programming by Anderson such as The Protectors and Space: 1999.

SHADO

To defend against the aliens, a secret organisation called SHADO, the Supreme Headquarters, Alien Defence Organisation, is established. Operating under the cover (as well as literally beneath the premises) of the Harlington-Straker Studios movie studio in England, SHADO is headed by Commander Edward Straker (Ed Bishop), a former United States Air Force colonel and astronaut, whose "cover" is his role as the studio's chief executive.

Establishing the main character and principal location as the chief executive of a movie studio was a cost-saving move by the producers: the Harlington-Straker Studio was the actual studio where the series was being filmed, originally the MGM-British Studios (later moved to Pinewood Studios) — although the Harlington-Straker studio office block seen throughout the series was actually Neptune House, a building at the former British National Studios in Borehamwood that was owned by ATV. Pinewood's studio buildings and streetscapes were used extensively in later episodes, particularly "Timelash" and "Mindbender" — the latter featuring scenes that show the behind-the-scenes workings of the UFO sets, when Straker briefly finds himself hallucinating that he is an actor in a TV series and all his SHADO colleagues are likewise actors. In "The Man Who Came Back", the main set for The Devils, then in production at Pinewood, can be seen in the background of several scenes.

Typical of Anderson's work, the studio-as-cover concept served multiple practical and narrative functions: It was simple and cost-effective for the production, it provided an engaging vehicle for the viewer's suspension of disbelief, it eliminated the need to build an expensive exterior set for the SHADO base, and it combined the all-important "secret" cover (concealment and secrecy are always central themes in Anderson dramas) with at least nominal plausibility. A studio was a business where unusual events and routines would not be remarkable or even noticed. Comings and goings at odd times, the movement of people and unusual vehicles, equipment and material would not create undue interest and could easily be explained away as sets, props, or extras.

Another recurring Anderson leitmotif was the concept of the mechanical conveyor (e.g. the automatic boarding tubes of the Stingray and the Thunderbird craft). In UFO this took several forms – Straker's "secret" office doubles as a secret elevator that takes him down to the SHADO control centre located beneath the studio, and the pilots of the Moonbase interceptors and the amphibious Sky One jet interceptor slide down boarding chutes to board their craft. The interceptors then rise from their hangar via elevating platforms to a launch pad disguised as a lunar crater. The device of the personnel boarding chute or conveyor served both narrative and practical functions – like firefighters responding to a fire alarm by sliding down the fireman's pole to board the fire engine, these personnel chutes/conveyors signified to the audience that the characters were embarking on a perilous mission; they were also a carry-over from the previous marionette series and were one of several plot devices (e.g. the Thunderbirds hover-bikes) which Anderson and his team devised to provide a fast-paced, futuristic and visually exciting way to move the action forward, whilst also minimising or eliminating the undesirable comical effect of seeing the marionettes walking, which might otherwise undercut the dramatic tension of the sequence.

Special effects
The special effects, supervised by Derek Meddings, were produced with limited resources. In a refinement of the underwater effect developed for Stingray, Meddings' team devised a disconcerting effect – a double-walled visor for the alien space helmets, which could be gradually filled from the bottom up with green-dyed water. When filmed from the appropriate angle it produced an illusion of the helmet filling up and submerging the wearer's head. The series also revisited and improved on the clever and cost-effective aquatic effects originally devised for Stingray. The submerged launch of Sky One was filmed on a special set dressed to look like an underwater location; a thin, glass-walled water tank containing small fish and equipped with small air-bubble generators was placed in front of the camera, the set behind the tank was filled with smoke, and set elements were agitated with fans to simulate water movement, creating a surprisingly convincing underwater scene without any of the high cost or technical problems associated with real underwater filming.

SHADO equipment
SHADO has a variety of high-tech hardware and vehicles at its disposal to implement a layered defence of Earth. Early warnings of alien attack would come from SID, the Space Intruder Detector, an unmanned computerised tracking satellite that constantly scans for UFO incursions. The forward line of defence is Moonbase from which the three lunar Interceptor spacecraft, that fire a single explosive warhead, are launched. The second line of defence includes Skydiver, a submarine mated with the submersible, undersea-launched Sky One interceptor aircraft, which attacks UFOs in Earth's atmosphere. The last line of defence is ground units including the armed, IFV-like SHADO Mobiles, fitted with caterpillar tracks.

On Earth, SHADO also uses two SHADAIR aircraft, a Seagull X-ray supersonic jet (e.g. in the episode "Identified") and a transport plane (e.g. in the episode "A Question of Priorities"); a transatlantic Lunar Carrier with a separating Lunar module (e.g. in "Computer Affair"); a Helicopter (actually, a small VTOL aeroplane with large rotating propellers, e.g. in the episode "Ordeal"); and a Radio-controlled (Space) Dumper (e.g. in "The Long Sleep"). Also, the Moonbase has hovercraft-like Moon Hoppers/Moonmobiles that can be deployed for transportation or reconnaissance.

The special effects (as in all Anderson's shows of this era) were supervised by Derek Meddings, and the vehicles were designed by Meddings and his assistant Michael Trim. As with all these Anderson series, the look and narrative action of UFO relied heavily on the groundbreaking miniature props and special effects sequences created by Meddings and his team, who devised a range of innovative low-cost, high-quality techniques used to create very convincing miniature sets and locations and miniature action scenes featuring ground transportation, underwater, atmospheric and space travel, and dramatic explosion effects. The large-scale miniature vehicles and craft used for close-up filming were extremely detailed and combine innovative design with a high level of fine workmanship. Most production miniatures typically consisted of a mixture of custom-made elements and detail pieces 'cannibalised' from commercial scale model kits.

As with all the Anderson/Century 21 programmes of that period, very few original series props and miniatures have survived, and these are now highly valuable collector's items. Miniatures from the series known to still exist include:

 Two of the alien 'flying saucer' UFO miniatures
 A single large-scale miniature of Sky One
 One large-scale and one small-scale miniature of the Moonbase Interceptors (which survived because they were given to Dinky for production of its Interceptor toys)
 The (badly damaged) front section only of the smaller miniature of the Space Intruder Detector (SID)
 The large-scale model of the SID2 orbital shuttle
 One prime mover of Marker Universal Transporter truck (the lorry and trailer used to secretly transport the SHADO Mobile vehicles to their operation sites)
 One large-scale SHADO ambulance
 One large-scale Harlington-Straker Studio transport truck (The model, based on the Mk 1 Ford Transit, had previously appeared in the final Supermarionation series The Secret Service)

UFOs
The extraterrestrial spacecraft can readily cross the vast distances between their planet and Earth at many times the speed of light (abbreviated and pronounced as "SOL"; e.g., "SOL one decimal seven" is 1.7 times the speed of light), but are too small to carry more than a few crew members. Their time on station is limited: UFOs can only survive for a couple of days in Earth's atmosphere before they deteriorate and finally explode. The UFOs can survive for far longer underwater; one episode, "Reflections in the Water", deals with the discovery of a secret undersea alien base and shows one UFO flying straight out of an extinct volcano, which Straker describes as "a back door to the Atlantic". A special underwater version of the standard UFO design is seen in "Sub-Smash". In flight they are surrounded by horizontally spinning vanes, and emit a distinctive pulsing electronic whine that sounds like a Shoooe-Wheeeh! (produced by series composer Barry Gray on an ondes Martenot). The craft is armed with a laser-type weapon, and conventional explosive warheads can destroy it. The personal arms of the aliens resemble shiny metal submachine guns; these have a lower rate of fire than those used by SHADO. Later episodes, such as "The Cat with Ten Lives", show the aliens using other weapons, such as a small device that paralyses victims.

Aliens
Notably for science fiction, the alien race is never given a proper name, either by themselves or by human beings; they are simply referred to as "the aliens". They are humanoid in appearance, and the post mortem examination of the first alien captured reveals that they are harvesting organs from the bodies of abducted humans to prolong their lifespans. However, the later episode "The Cat with Ten Lives" suggests that these "humanoids" are actually beings subject to alien mind control, and one "alien" body recovered was suspected of being completely Homo sapiens, "possessed" by one of the alien minds—a concept central to Anderson's previous Supermarionation series Captain Scarlet and the Mysterons. Their faces are stained green by the hue of a green oxygenated liquid, which is believed to cushion their lungs against the extreme acceleration of interstellar flight; this liquid is contained in their helmets. To protect their eyes, the aliens wear opaque sclera contact lenses with small pinholes for vision. The show's opening sequence begins by showing the image of one of these contact lenses being removed from an obviously real eye with a small suction cup, even though the lens is not shown in contact with the eye. The entire lens-removal sequence is shown in the pilot episode.

Only two of the alien suits were made, so at no point in the series are more than two of the aliens seen on screen at any one time. In the episode "Ordeal", Paul Foster is carried by two aliens while he is wearing an alien space suit, but one of those two aliens is always off-screen when Foster is on-screen.

The alien spacesuit costumes were made of red spandex. At the start of production, the alien spacesuits were ornamented with brass chain mesh, as seen in the episode "Survival". Later, this was replaced by silvery panels. In reality, the dark vertical bands on the sides of the helmets were slits meant to allow the actors to breathe.

Look of the show

The Andersons never explained at the time why female Moonbase personnel uniformly wore mauve or purple wigs, silver catsuits, and extensive eye make-up. Furthermore, their unusual apparel is never discussed in the series. Gerry Anderson has since commented that it made them look more futuristic and that it filmed better under the bright lights, while Sylvia Anderson said she believed wigs would become accepted components of military uniforms by the 1980s. However, in an interview given toward the end of her life, Sylvia explained that the decision was a combination of visual appeal and practicality - the wigs provided a striking and futuristic look, but they also saved the production the considerable time and expense of having to style the hair of each of the female Moonbase staff for each episode, as well as keeping the 'look' of the hairstyles consistent from episode to episode. However, whenever female Moonbase personnel visited Earth (as Ellis and Barry did from time to time), their lunar uniforms and wigs were never worn.
The show's fictional conception of futuristic dress can be compared to André Courreges' actual futurist  'Space Designs' really worn just before the show's time.

Ed Bishop, who had naturally dark hair, initially bleached his hair for Straker's unique white-haired look. After the break in production he began wearing a white wig. Until not long before his death he possessed one of the wigs he wore on the show, and took great delight in displaying it at science fiction conventions and on TV programmes. In the episode "Mindbender", Stuart Damon is seen wearing the same white wig, although deliberately ill-fitting, in a dream sequence segment. Bishop also kept a Certina watch that was specially made for his character.

Other male characters in the series also wore wigs, again because the Andersons felt that they would become fashionable for both sexes by the 1980s. Michael Billington does not wear a wig in early episodes; these can be identified by his receding hairline and long sideburns.

On both Skydiver and Moonbase, SHADO pilots enter their interceptor craft by sliding down tubes. This is an allusion to the Andersons' earlier series Thunderbirds, which had the characters reaching their craft in similar fashion. This was owing to the difficulty of getting a puppet into a cockpit easily and in a natural way.

The SHADO HQ and Moonbase control consoles, computer units, lighting panels and spacesuits make numerous appearances in later TV shows of the 1970s such as Doctor Who, Timeslip, Doomwatch, The Tomorrow People, The Goodies, The New Avengers, Star Maidens and Blake's 7, as well as feature films such as Diamonds Are Forever, Carry On Loving and Confessions of a Pop Performer. An alien spacesuit can also be seen in the Children's Film Foundation production Kadoyng.

Sylvia Anderson, having had made a pair of very sheer trousers for actor Patrick Allen to wear in the episode "Timelash", later regretted not having had the nerve to ask him to wear a jockstrap underneath, and commented on the DVD release of the series that "you should not be able to tell which side anybody's 'packet' is on".

The futuristic, gull-winged cars driven by Straker and Foster were originally built for the Anderson movie Doppelgänger. During the shooting of UFO, David Lowe and Sydney Carlton raised funds to form a company called The Explorer Motor Company, dedicated to the mass production of these cars for sale to the public. A plastic mould was made of the Straker car, in preparation for mass production, but the company never got off the ground. Both Ed Bishop and Michael Billington commented that the futuristic cars were "impossible to drive", partly because the steering wheel was designed for looks rather than functionality. Also, the gull-wing doors did not open automatically. Every shot in which the car door was seen to open automatically had to be arranged so that a prop man could run up to the car, just outside the frame, open the door, and hold it open while Ed Bishop stepped out. In certain episodes (most notably "Court Martial") the prop man can be seen. The show also made limited use of American models, which were unfamiliar to British viewers. These supposedly futuristic vehicles included a 1965 Ford Galaxie station wagon and an Oldsmobile Toronado.

The Blue SHADO Jeeps, six-wheeled light utility vehicles, were originally supplied for Doppelgänger. Using modified Austin Mini Moke chassis with an extra rear axle, the marine ply, fibreglass and perspex bodies, fitted for the film were modified, with the windscreen moved rearwards. As with the other SHADO vehicles, gull-wing doors, operated by a prop man out of shot, were fitted. Later episodes, such as "Timelash" saw these doors omitted, presumably for ease of filming.

The episode "Survival" shows that SHADO's Moonbase is in the Mare Imbrium, or in the northeast part of it, according to a map that Foster and an alien studied while they were stranded on the surface. The map is a real one.

On the Carlton DVD commentary for the first episode, Gerry Anderson noted that perhaps the programme's most dated aspect was its tobacco and alcohol consumption, although in the 1980 of real-life England and America there was still plenty of smoking indoors and many executives had bars in their offices. Straker has a futuristic home bar in his office, from which Col. Freeman partakes fairly regularly. While Straker himself does not drink, he is regularly seen smoking in SHADO headquarters, his tobacco of choice being either a cigarette or what appears to be a slim panatela cigar, complete with holder. And despite the high-tech milieu and enclosed environments, smoking is seen throughout the show, as it often was in 1970s British television drama. As a consequence, some of the sequences in the bunker of SHADO HQ are seen through a slight smoky haze. Similarly, many of the medical staff smoke whilst on duty, and smoking is even permitted on board the closed environment of the Skydiver, where Capt. Carlin is shown idly flicking through magazines with a cigarette in hand. Most striking of all, Moonbase personnel also light up frequently.

Second series and Space: 1999
Two years after the 26 episodes were completed, the series was syndicated on American television. Many stations who carried the series were affiliated with CBS; they tended to schedule the show in the Saturday evening hour leading into All in the Family, the hugely popular comedy which was the highest-rated program on all of U.S. television at the time. (The FCC had mandated that the major networks give back the first half-hour of the evening schedule to local stations, as an attempt to limit the networks' dominance in programming at the expense of independent producers.) Naturally, the ratings of UFO were initially promising enough to prompt ITC to commission a second series. 

As the Moon-based episodes appeared to have proven more popular than the Earth-based stories, ITC insisted that in the new series, the action would take place entirely on the Moon. Gerry Anderson proposed a format in which SHADO Moonbase had been greatly enlarged to become the organisation's main headquarters, and pre-production on UFO 2 began with extensive research and design for the new Moonbase. These developments had precedent in the earlier episodes: a subplot of "Kill Straker!" sees Straker negotiating with SHADO's financial supporters for funding to build more moonbases within 10 years. However, when ratings for the syndicated broadcasts in America dropped towards the end of the run, ITC cancelled the second series plans. Unwilling to let the UFO 2 pre-production work go to waste, Anderson instead offered ITC a new series idea, unrelated to UFO, in which the Moon would be blown out of Earth orbit taking the Moonbase survivors with it. This proposal developed into Space: 1999.

Media

VHS release
In 1986-1987, Channel 5 released a seven-volume VHS collection of episodes (volumes 2-7), preceded by the compilation film Invasion: UFO (volume 1), while a similar series was later released by ITC in 1993.

DVD release
The complete series was released on DVD in the UK and in North America in 2002 and in Australia in 2007. Bonus features include a commentary by Gerry Anderson on the pilot episode "Identified", and an actor's commentary by Ed Bishop on the episode "Sub-Smash". There are also deleted scenes, stills and publicity artwork.

In 2002, A&E Home Entertainment, under licence from Carlton International Media Limited released the complete series on Region 1 (US/North America) DVD.

Merchandise
As with many Anderson productions, the series generated a range of merchandising toys based on the SHADO vehicles. The classic Dinky die-cast range of vehicles featured robust yet finely finished products, and included Straker's futuristic gull-winged gas turbine car, the SHADO mobile and the missile-bearing Lunar Interceptor, though Dinky's version of the interceptor was released in a lurid metallic green finish unlike the original's stark white. Like the Thunderbirds and Captain Scarlet models, the original Dinky toys are now prized collectors' items. All the major vehicles, characters, and more have been produced in model form many times over by a large number of licensee companies; the Anderson shows and their merchandise have always had widespread popularity, but they are especially popular in Japan.

Revivals
Several attempts have been made to either revive or remake the series.

Australian company Bump Map, run by Albert Hastings, pitched a revival of UFO to one of Australia's major TV production companies in 1995/6. Also in 1996, Ed Bishop briefly corresponded with independent Australian film maker/UFO fan Adrian Sherlock about an unofficial revival called Damon Dark: Shadofall. Funding for the project fell through, but the script has been made into a fan-made audio production and uploaded to YouTube, and it continues as an independent series.

Film
In 2009, it was announced that producer Robert Evans and ITV Global would produce a big-screen adaptation of the series. Ryan Gaudet and Joseph Kanarek were to write the script, which was to be set in 2020. It was claimed that the UFO movie would be visual effects supervisor Matthew Gratzner's directorial debut and that Joshua Jackson would play Col. Paul Foster. Ali Larter was linked to the role of Col. Virginia Lake. However, the film did not go ahead.

Producers Avi Haas and Matthew Gratzner posted on the official UFO film website that the film was under development and planned for a summer 2013 release. However, nothing was completed, and the film's web page is no longer available.

UFO stories in other media

Stories set in the Gerry Anderson UFO series have appeared in various media:

 Two novelisations based on the series, written by John Burke under the pseudonym "Robert Miall", were published in the UK and America:
UFO (published in the USA as UFO-1: Flesh Hunters). Novelises portions of the TV episodes Identified, Exposed, Close Up and Court Martial.
UFO 2 (published in the USA as UFO-2: Sporting Blood). Novelises the TV episodes Computer Affair, The Dalotek Affair and Survival .
 UFO comic strips were published in the comics Countdown and TV Action.
 Between 1991 and 1999, Entropy Express (based in Brighton, South Australia) published seven issues of a periodical called Flightpath, containing 39 text stories set in the UFO universe. These include a crossover with Bergerac and another with Predator.
 UFO episodes were adapted as photocomics in the Italian publication I film di UFO ("The UFO films").
 There was a hardback annual for the series that featured text stories.
 Much fan-fiction has been written in this series' scenario.
 An Italian-language board game of the race game type was published, called "Distruggete Base Luna" ("Destroy Moonbase"; in reference to the compilation movie), with up to four players, each representing an alien trying to penetrate Moonbase, and one player representing Straker in charge of Moonbase.
 The video game X-COM: UFO Defense, is heavily inspired by this series. The game sees the aliens use telepathy to control the soldiers, as in "The Cat with Ten Lives". In the sequel X-COM: Terror from the Deep aliens have built liveable environments in the sea forcing you to go on "scuba-diving" missions to find and destroy their main control centre as seen in the finale of "Reflections in the Water". Also, aliens not killed during a crash landing or battle but captured go under autopsy to further the understanding of the aliens' motives, as in "Computer Affair". A remake of X-COM: UFO Defense entitled XCOM: Enemy Unknown was released in 2012; it had connections to the original show and featured a nod to the show in some of the dialogue: "Some nut calling himself 'Commander Straker' has been all over the news, ranting about 'SHADO agents'."
 Character designer Yoshiyuki Sadamoto has admitted inspiration from UFO for the character designs for Gendo Ikari and Kozo Fuyutsuki in Neon Genesis Evangelion (from Straker and Freeman respectively).

Translations
 French: UFO – Alerte dans l’espace
 German: Ufo – Weltraumkommando S.H.A.D.O.
 Japanese: Nazo no Enban Yū-Efu-Ō (謎の円盤UFO, UFO: The Mysterious Saucers)
 Italian: UFO (Italy) and Minaccia dallo spazio (canton of Ticino)
 Spanish: OVNI (although the Spanish 2007 DVD release title remains UFO)

See also

 The Indestructible Man, a Doctor Who novel with a scenario derived from various Gerry Anderson story scenarios, including UFO.

References

Further reading

External links

UFO episode guide on the Fanderson website
UFO, Countdown, and TV Action comic strip stories
Episode reviews at The Anorak Zone

 
1970s British science fiction television series
1970 British television series debuts
1971 British television series endings
Alien abduction in television
Aviation television series
British science fiction adventure television series
English-language television shows
First-run syndicated television programs in the United States
Space adventure television series
Television series about alien visitations
Television series about the Moon
Television series by ITC Entertainment
Television series produced at Pinewood Studios
Television series set in 1980
Television series set in the future
UFO-related television
Television shows shot at MGM-British Studios